Lars Rise (born 18 March 1955 in Hamar) is a Norwegian politician for the Christian Democratic Party.

He was elected to the Norwegian Parliament from Oslo in 1997, and was re-elected on one occasion.

Rise was a member of Hordaland county council during the term 1979–1983.

References

1955 births
Living people
Christian Democratic Party (Norway) politicians
Members of the Storting
21st-century Norwegian politicians
20th-century Norwegian politicians
Politicians from Hamar